Ariete is an Italian main battle tank.

Ariete may also refer to :

 132nd Armored Division "Ariete", a disbanded Italian Army unit
 Armored Brigade "Ariete", an active Italian Army unit
 Aerfer Ariete, a prototype fighter aircraft from the 1950s
 Ariete-class torpedo boat, a group of destroyer escorts which are built for the Italian Navy during World War II
 Ariete (singer), an Italian singer and songwriter
 The name for the Reggiane Re.2002 fighter aircraft

See also
 Arriete-Ciego Montero, a Cuban village